The Southern Rhodesia Legislative Council election of 12 April 1911 was the fifth election to the Legislative Council of Southern Rhodesia. The Legislative Council had, since 1907, comprised thirteen voting members: the Administrator of Southern Rhodesia ex officio, five members nominated by the British South Africa Company, and seven members elected by registered voters from four electoral districts. The Resident Commissioner of Southern Rhodesia, Robert Burns-Begg also sat on the Legislative Council ex officio but without the right to vote.

Boundaries
The boundaries of the districts were slightly changed at this election. Only minor changes were made to the Eastern and Northern Districts, but a substantial area of territory around Kariba and Gokwe was removed from the Midlands District to the Western District.

Results

* Incumbents

Nominated members
The members nominated by the British South Africa Company were:

 Clarkson Henry Tredgold, Attorney-General
 Dr Eric Arthur Nobbs PhD BSc FHAS, Director of Agriculture
 James Hutchison Kennedy, Master of the High Court
 Ernest William Sanders Montagu, Secretary for Mines and Works
 Francis James Newton CVO CMG, Treasurer

Clarkson Henry Tredgold was absent during the second session of the Legislative Council, and was replaced by Robert Macilwaine (Acting Attorney-General) from 30 November 1911.

References
 Source Book of Parliamentary Elections and Referenda in Southern Rhodesia 1898-1962 ed. by F.M.G. Willson (Department of Government, University College of Rhodesia and Nyasaland, Salisbury 1963)
 Holders of Administrative and Ministerial Office 1894-1964 by F.M.G. Willson and G.C. Passmore, assisted by Margaret T. Mitchell (Source Book No. 3, Department of Government, University College of Rhodesia and Nyasaland, Salisbury 1966)
 Official Year Book of the Colony of Southern Rhodesia, No. 1 - 1924, Salisbury, Southern Rhodesia

Legislative Council election,1911
1911 elections in Africa
Legislative Council election
Non-partisan elections
1911 elections in the British Empire